Kenneth Douglas Caillat is an American record producer. He is best known for engineering the Fleetwood Mac albums Rumours, Tusk, Mirage, Live, and The Chain Box Set.

Life and career
Caillat was the president of 5.1 Entertainment Group Digital Production Services, which has worked on albums for Billy Idol, Frank Sinatra, Pat Benatar, Wilson Phillips, the Beach Boys, Herbie Hancock, David Becker and Alice Cooper as well as Christine McVie on her solo album In the Meantime, in addition to Fleetwood Mac, remastering several of their albums in 5.1 surround sound. He won a Grammy Award for Album of the Year for Rumours.

In addition to production, he has been a director, studio engineer, author and musician. In 2012 he released his memoir on his experiences engineering the 1977 Rumours album, called Making Rumours. In 2013, Caillat cofounded Sleeping Giant Music Group, LLC (a Sleeping Giant Media company) with Grammy nominated writer/producer Michael Hodges and writer/producer Kayla Morrison. In 2014, Sleeping Giant partnered with Alcon Entertainment to form ASG Music Group, LLC.

He is the father of singer-songwriter Colbie Caillat and  produced her albums Coco (2007), Breakthrough (2009), All of You (2011), and Christmas in the Sand (2012). He advised his daughter on taking up songwriting from an early age. In an interview with the Music Producers Forum  he recalls telling a young Colbie, "If you're really going to be a singer, then you have two choices, you're going to have to write your own songs, or you're going to have to buy somebody else's."

In January 2016, Caillat, who had a passion for the history of the Record Plant studio in Sausalito, California, where Rumours had been recorded, realized the necessity for its restoration. After developing what was thought to be a more sustainable business model for the music industry, he incorporated under the name Marin Music Project at the Record Plant in January 2017.

Production discography
How Time Flys (1973)  – David Ossman (Engineer)
Fairytale (1965) – Donovan (Producer)
Basket of Light (1969) – Pentangle (Executive producer)
Astrud Gilberto Now (1972) – Astrud Gilberto (Executive producer)
Love Music (1973) – Sergio Mendes (Assistant)
The Phoenix Concerts (1974) – John Stewart (Assistant engineer, engineer)
Where We All Belong (1974) – The Marshall Tucker Band (Engineer)
Elevation (1973) – Pharoah Sanders (Engineer)
Gabby Pahinui Hawaiian Band, Vol. 1 (1975) – Gabby Pahinui (Engineer)
The Waimea Music Festival (1974)  (Engineer, Mixer) 
Searchin' for a Rainbow (1975) – The Marshall Tucker Band (Engineer)
Amazonas (1975) – Cal Tjader (Remixing, engineer)
Cool Rasta (1976) – The Heptones (Executive producer)
Greatest Stories Live (1976) – Harry Chapin (Engineer)
Look at Me Now – The Buckeye Politicians (Engineer)
Warren Zevon (1976) – Warren Zevon (Audio engineer)
Rumours (1977) – Fleetwood Mac (Engineer, Mastering); Winner Grammy Award for Album of the Year.
Germfree Adolescents (1978) – X-Ray Spex (Executive producer)
Tusk (1979) – Fleetwood Mac (Remastering, engineer)
Distant Shores (1980) – Robbie Patton (Engineer, producer)
Live (1980) – Fleetwood Mac (Engineer, mixing)
Mirage (1982) – Fleetwood Mac (Engineer)
Photon: The Ultimate Game on Planet Earth (1982) - (Engineer, producer)
Which One of Us Is Me (1984) – Jay Gruska (Engineer)
Dancing on the Ceiling (1986) – Lionel Richie (Special Effects, engineer)
Bad (1987) – Michael Jackson (Engineer)
Streamlines (1987) – Tom Scott
"The Cockney Kids Are Innocent" on The First, the Best and the Last (1980) – Sham 69 (Executive producer)
"Siberian Express" (1988) David BeckerTribune (Producer, engineer)
Live (1988) – The Dramatics (Engineer)
Greatest Hits (1988) – Fleetwood Mac (Producer)
Dorian's Legacy (1989) – Spencer Brewer (Engineer)
Third Time Around (1990) - David BeckerTribune (Producer, engineer)
Live and Improvised (1991) – Blood, Sweat & Tears (Engineer)
Live at Ronnie Scott's (1990) – Taj Mahal (Executive producer)
Third Time Around (1990) – David BeckerTribune (Engineer, mixing, producer)
25 Years – The Chain (1992) – Fleetwood Mac (Producer, engineer)
How Far? How Fast? (1992) – Robin Frederick (Design, producer, mixing, engineer)
Mom's (1992) – Carl Stone (Audio engineer)
Seven Day Weekend (1992) – New York Dolls (Executive producer)
Deaf Forever: The Best of Motörhead (2000) – Motörhead (Executive producer)
Fiend with a Violin (1996) – The Fall (Executive producer)
Very Best of the Searchers (1998) – The Searchers (Executive producer)
Close to the Wind (1998) – Fairport Convention (Executive producer)
Tchaikovsky: Nutcracker (Highlights) (DVD Audio) – London Symphony Orchestra (Producer, executive producer)
Erase the Slate (1999) – Dokken (Executive producer)
The Little David Years (1971–1977) (1999) – George Carlin (Engineer)
Directions: East – Directions (Executive producer)
Directions: North – Directions (Executive producer)
Directions: South – Directions (Executive producer)
Directions: West – Directions (Executive producer)
Elements: Earth – Elements (Executive producer, producer)
Elements: Spirit – Elements (Executive producer, producer)
Elements: Water – Elements (Executive producer, producer)
Bare Bones (1999) – Wishbone Ash (Executive producer)
Then and Now (2000) – Lynyrd Skynyrd (Executive producer, mixing)
Coco (2007) – Colbie Caillat (Executive producer, mixing, producer, audio production)
Breakthrough (2009) – Colbie Caillat (Mixing, producer, engineer, Rhythm Arrangements, executive producer)
All of You (2011) – Colbie Caillat (producer)
Christmas in the Sand (2012) – Colbie Caillat (producer)
Rumours 5.1 Fleetwood Mac(2015)
Mirage 5.1 Fleetwood Mac(2016)

Sources
 
 Fleetwood Mac Official site
 5.1 Entertainment Group, MIX Magazine
 Recording Academy's Producers & Engineers Wing Presents "Approaching the First 5.1 Mix" Business Wire, December 6, 2000

References

External links

1952 births
American record producers
Grammy Award winners
Living people
Santa Clara University alumni